Andre McXavier Roberts (born January 9, 1988) is an American football wide receiver and return specialist for the Carolina Panthers of the National Football League (NFL). He played college football at The Citadel and was drafted by the Arizona Cardinals in the third round of the 2010 NFL Draft. Roberts has also played for the Washington Redskins, Detroit Lions, Atlanta Falcons, New York Jets, Buffalo Bills, Houston Texans, and the Los Angeles Chargers.

Early years
A native of Fairbanks, Alaska, Roberts attended Spring Valley High School in Columbia, South Carolina, where he was a two-sport star in football and track. He earned All-region and All-area honors as a senior and led the Vikings to the regional championship and state semi-finals. He earned MVP honors for his performance in the 2005 North-South All-Star game.

In addition to football, Roberts lettered in track & field while at Spring Valley, leading his team to the state championship in 2003 and a second-place finish as a senior, the season he captured All-State recognition. He posted personal-bests of 11.2 in the 100-meter dash, 21.91 in the 200-meter dash and 48.60 in the 400-meter dash.

College career
Roberts attended The Citadel, The Military College of South Carolina from 2006 to 2009, where he played football and ran track. He was a three-time All Southern Conference selection and two-time FCS All American who set school records for receptions in a game (14), season (95) and career (286); receiving yards in a season (1,334) and career (3,743); touchdown receptions in a game (4), season (14) and career (37); punt return yards in a season (461) and career (1,160) as well as career all-purpose yards (5,203).

Roberts joined The Citadel outdoor track team in mid-March 2007, earning his first Penn Relays Championship watch. He made his debut at the Furman Invitational (4/07), as he finished third in the 400 meters, running 50.91. Also at Furman, he finished second in the 200 meters with a time of 23.49. He ran a collegiate-best 200-meter time of 23.05 at the Chanticleer Invitational (4/14). He ran the anchor leg of the 4x100-meter relay that clocked 41.94 at the Southern Conference Championships (4/22), garnering All-Conference honors. Also ran the anchor leg of the 4×100-meter relay team that won at the Penn Relays for the fifth consecutive time in Citadel history. He graduated in three and a half years with a degree in accounting.

Professional career

Arizona Cardinals
Roberts was taken in the third round with the 88th overall pick by the Arizona Cardinals in the 2010 NFL Draft. The Cardinals originally obtained the pick used to select Roberts by trading Anquan Boldin to the Baltimore Ravens.

Roberts started out his rookie season playing limited time as a punt returner. As the season went on, Roberts started playing more snaps and started to move into the second receiver slot. He caught his first NFL touchdown against the Minnesota Vikings, a 27–24 loss in OT. He caught his second NFL touchdown, a 74-yard completion, on Christmas Day against the Dallas Cowboys, a game that was won in the last minute 27–26.

Washington Redskins

On March 11, 2014, Roberts and the Washington Redskins agreed to terms on a four-year contract, worth roughly $16 million. The contract was finalized the next day. Later that month, Roberts made a $12,000 donation to the Kirk Cousins Football Camp, allowing Roberts the rights to wear number 12, which he wore for four seasons in Arizona. He originally signed with the intention to be the Redskins' number two wide receiver, opposite of Pierre Garçon, but became the number three receiver after the signing of DeSean Jackson. He also became the team's new return specialist.

In the Week 4, 45–14 loss against the New York Giants, Roberts scored one of the only two Redskins' scores in the game after catching an 18-yard pass from Cousins. It was his first touchdown with the Redskins.

In Week 11 of the 2015 season, Roberts returned a kick 99 yards for a touchdown against the Carolina Panthers. On December 21, 2015, he was placed on injured reserve with an knee injury, ending his season.

Roberts was released by the Redskins on May 17, 2016.

Detroit Lions
On June 13, 2016, Roberts signed a one-year deal with the Detroit Lions.

On October 2, 2016, Roberts returned a punt 85 yards for a touchdown against the Chicago Bears. During a week 11 victory over the Jacksonville Jaguars, Roberts had another punt return touchdown, this time for 55 yards. Roberts also had several critical catches during the regular season, and finished the year with 14 receptions for 188 yards and a touchdown.

Atlanta Falcons
On March 14, 2017, Roberts signed a one-year contract with the Atlanta Falcons.

On September 10, 2017, in his Falcons debut, Roberts was the kickoff and punt returner in the 23–17 victory over the Chicago Bears at Soldier Field. He served as the Falcons' primary kick and punt returner in 2017, while only recording one catch for 12 yards on offense.

New York Jets
On March 23, 2018, Roberts signed with the New York Jets. On September 10, in the season opener against the Detroit Lions, Roberts scored his first punt return touchdown, which went for 78 yards, as a Jet. In a week 15 game against the Houston Texans he had a touchdown reception and added 93 yards in kick returns; he was named to the 2018 AFC Pro Bowl squad as a return specialist. In Week 16, against the Green Bay Packers, he had a 99-yard kickoff return for a touchdown and a career high 215 return yards. Roberts finished with career bests for both punt and kickoff returns with 324 and 1,174 yards, respectively, in addition to adding 10 catches for 79 yards and a score on offense. He was the first member of the Jets named to the All-Pro team since 2011.

Buffalo Bills

On March 13, 2019, Roberts signed a two-year contract with the Buffalo Bills. During the 2019 season he caught 3 passes and returned 53 kicks for 888 yards; he was named as an alternate to the Pro Bowl where he returned 2 punts and caught a 5-yard touchdown pass from Josh Allen.

On September 5, 2020, Roberts was released by the Bills, but was re-signed the following day after some additional roster adjustments.

During the 2020 season, Roberts caught four passes for 34 yards, returning 29 punts for 286 yards (9.9 yards per return) and 32 kick returns for 961 yards (league-leading 30.0 yards per return). Roberts also led the league in total return yards and was named a Pro Bowler and Second-team All-Pro.

Houston Texans
On March 24, 2021, Roberts signed a two-year deal with the Houston Texans. On October 18, 2021, Roberts was released by the Texans.

Los Angeles Chargers
On October 21, 2021, Roberts signed with the Los Angeles Chargers.

Carolina Panthers
On May 2, 2022, Roberts signed with the Carolina Panthers. He was placed on injured reserve on September 13, 2022 with a knee injury. He was activated on December 31.

References

External links

Washington Redskins bio
Arizona Cardinals bio

1988 births
Living people
Players of American football from Columbia, South Carolina
African-American players of American football
American football wide receivers
American football return specialists
American people of United States Virgin Islands descent
The Citadel Bulldogs football players
The Citadel Bulldogs men's track and field athletes
Arizona Cardinals players
Washington Redskins players
Detroit Lions players
Atlanta Falcons players
New York Jets players
Buffalo Bills players
Houston Texans players
Los Angeles Chargers players
Carolina Panthers players
21st-century African-American sportspeople
20th-century African-American people
American Conference Pro Bowl players
Ed Block Courage Award recipients